Patrick Miller Hemingway (born June 28, 1928) is an American wildlife manager and writer who is novelist Ernest Hemingway's second son, and the first born to Hemingway's second wife Pauline Pfeiffer. During his childhood he travelled frequently with his parents, and then attended Harvard University, graduated in 1950, and shortly thereafter moved to East Africa where he lived for 25 years. In Tanzania, Patrick was a professional big-game hunter and for over a decade he owned a safari business. In the 1960s he was appointed by the United Nations  to the Wildlife Management College in Tanzania as a teacher of conservation and wildlife. In the 1970s he moved to Montana where he managed the intellectual property of his father's estate. He edited his father's unpublished novel about a 1950s safari to Africa and published it with the title True at First Light (1999).

Personal life
Born in Kansas City, Missouri, he traveled with his parents to Europe in 1929 and again in 1933, to Wyoming and Idaho during his summers, though his permanent residence was in Key West. In 1940, his parents divorced, after which his father married Martha Gellhorn. After their marriage, they moved to Cuba where Patrick visited often. At the beginning of World War II, Patrick helped crew his father's boat, the Pilar, on improvised missions to hunt for German U-boats operating in the Gulf of Mexico. Patrick attended Stanford University for two years, transferred to Harvard and graduated in 1950 with a BA in History and Literature.

On April 5, 2021, Hemingway, a three-episode, six-hour documentary, a recapitulation of Hemingway's life, labors, and loves, debuted on the Public Broadcasting Service. It was co-produced and directed by Ken Burns and Lynn Novick. It contains considerable footage and photographs of Patrick, and interviews with him about his life with his father. Patrick was married to Henrietta Broyles, with whom he has a daughter, Mina Hemingway (born 1960).

Africa
Having studied agriculture at his mother's plantation in Piggott, Arkansas, Patrick used his inheritance after her death to buy a  farm near Dar-es-Salaam. He and his wife moved to Africa, where he lived for 25 years.  Patrick lived for much of his life in Tanganyika where he ran a safari expedition company; served as a white hunter to wealthy patrons; and as an honorary game warden in Kenya, Uganda, and Tanzania. He started his safari business, called Tanganyika Safari Business, near Mount Kilimanjaro in 1955, which he gave up in the early 1960s when his wife was ill. For 12 years he taught conservation of wildlife at the College of African Wildlife Management in Tanzania, as part of his job as forestry officer in the Food and Agricultural Organization (FAO) of the United Nations. The College of African Wildlife Management at Mweka trains armed officers to enforce wildlife protection laws in Sub-Saharan Africa.

His father Ernest died in 1961, and his wife Henrietta died in 1963. When he left Africa he moved to Bozeman, Montana, where he has lived since 1975. He oversees the management of Ernest Hemingway's intellectual property, which includes projects in publishing, electronic media, and movies in the United States and worldwide.

True at First Light
Hemingway edited his father's "Africa book" that was published in 1999 with the title True at First Light. The book is a blend of fact and fiction from the East Africa expedition Ernest and fourth wife Mary went on from late 1953 to early 1954, in part to visit Patrick and his wife. Toward the end of the trip Ernest Hemingway was in two successive plane crashes and was reported dead. He sustained a severe head injury which went largely undiagnosed until he left Africa. Upon his return to Cuba he worked sporadically on True at First Light, but eventually set it aside.

The manuscript was in the John F. Kennedy Library Hemingway Archives, and Patrick edited the 800 pages down to half the size. He had been present with his father during much of the expedition and was familiar with the events of Africa during that year, which he describes in the "Foreword" to True at First Light.

Additional writing
Hemingway contributed an introduction to the 1990 Green Hills of Africa; the 1991 Valley of Life: Africa's Great Rift; the 2003 Hemingway on Hunting; the 2003 Hemingway on War; and a "foreword" to the 2009 republished edition of his father's A Moveable Feast. For the 2012 special edition of A Farewell to Arms, containing all forty-seven alternative endings, Patrick wrote a personal foreword. His nephew, grandson of Ernest Hemingway, Seán Hemingway, wrote the introduction.

References

Sources

External links

The Patrick Hemingway Papers at Princeton University
Hemingway-Pfeiffer timeline

1928 births
Living people
Writers about Africa
American hunters
American naturalists
Writers from Kansas City, Missouri
Harvard University alumni
Hemingway family
Writers from Bozeman, Montana
People from Piggott, Arkansas